Jelena Trivić (born 8 August 1983) is a Bosnian Serb politician and university professor serving as a member of the National Assembly of Republika Srpska since October 2018. She is the vice president of the centre-right Party of Democratic Progress.

Early life and education
Trivić was born on 8 August 1983 in Banja Luka, SR Bosnia and Herzegovina, SFR Yugoslavia. She graduated at the Faculty of Economics, University of Banja Luka in 2006, obtained her her master's degree from the University of Bologna in 2007 and gained her doctorate from the Faculty of Economics, University of Belgrade in 2013.

Trivić is an associate professor at the Faculty of Economics, University of Banja Luka.

Political career
Trivić publicly supported the group "Justice for David" in the fight for truth about the death of David Dragičević and strongly condemned the reactions of the Ministry of Internal Affairs of Republika Srpska who arrested the peaceful protestors in Krajina Square, including the parents of Dragičević.

Trivić was elected member of the National Assembly of Republika Srpska following the 2018 Republika Srpska general election as a candidate of the Party of Democratic Progress (PDP). She is a member of the Parliamentary Committee for Trade and Tourism and the Committee for Finance and Budget.

She was a joint candidate of the PDP and Serb Democratic Party (SDS) for President of Republika Srpska in the 2022 Republika Srpska general election. On election night, she claimed victory despite preliminary data from Bosnia’s Central Electoral Commission showing that incumbent Milorad Dodik won with 48% of the vote and around 30,000 more votes than Trivić, alleging voter fraud. After Trivić and Republika Srpska's opposition parties demanded a recount, Dodik's victory was confirmed by election officials weeks later, though Trivić still refused to concede.

Political positions
Trivić is a critic of Milorad Dodik and his ruling Alliance of Independent Social Democrats (SNSD), claiming that Dodik is an "agent of Croatian interests", that he "cannot be trusted" and that "corruption, crime, economic disaster and the SNSD will destroy Republika Srpska".

In July 2021, regarding the Srebrenica massacre, Trivić stated that the "crime that happened in Srebrenica is not genocide, these are facts" and that "Serbs are not people who kneel before the occupier".

Personal life
Jelena is married to Dejan Trivić and has two sons. She also holds Serbian citizenship. Besides her native Serbian, Trivić also speaks English and Italian.

References

External links

1983 births
Living people
People from Banja Luka
Serbs of Bosnia and Herzegovina
University of Banja Luka alumni
University of Belgrade Faculty of Economics alumni
University of Bologna alumni
Bosnia and Herzegovina politicians
Politicians of Republika Srpska
Party of Democratic Progress politicians